Space launch is the earliest part of a flight that reaches space. Space launch involves liftoff, when a rocket or other space launch vehicle leaves the ground, floating ship or midair aircraft at the start of a flight. Liftoff is of two main types: rocket launch (the current conventional method), and non-rocket spacelaunch (where other forms of propulsion are employed, including airbreathing jet engines or other kinds).

Issues with reaching space

Definition of outer space

There is no clear boundary between Earth's atmosphere and space, as the density of the atmosphere gradually decreases as the altitude increases. There are several standard boundary designations, namely:
Astronaut wings are now only awarded to spacecraft crew members that "demonstrated activities during flight that were essential to public safety, or contributed to human space flight safety".

Energy
Therefore, by definition for spaceflight to occur, sufficient altitude is necessary. This implies a minimum gravitational potential energy needs to be overcome: for the Kármán line this is approximately 1 MJ/kg.
W=mgh, m=1 kg, g=9.82 m/s2, h=105m.
W=1*9.82*105≈106J/kg=1MJ/kg

In practice, a higher energy than this is needed to be expended due to losses such as airdrag, propulsive efficiency, cycle efficiency of engines that are employed and gravity drag.

In the past fifty years spaceflight has usually meant remaining in space for a period of time, rather than going up and immediately falling back to earth. This entails orbit, which is mostly a matter of velocity, not altitude, although that does not mean air friction and relevant altitudes in relation to that and orbit don't have to be taken into account. At much, much higher altitudes than many orbital ones maintained by satellites, altitude begins to become a larger and larger factor and speed a lesser one. At lower altitudes, due to the high speed required to remain in orbit, air friction is a very important consideration affecting satellites, much more than in the popular image of space. At even lower altitudes, balloons, with no forward velocity, can serve many of the roles satellites play.

G-forces
Many cargos, particularly humans have a limiting g-force that they can survive. For humans this is about 3-6 g. Some launchers such as gun launchers would give accelerations in the hundred or thousands of g and thus are completely unsuitable.

Reliability
Launchers vary with respect to their reliability for achieving the mission.

Safety
Safety is the probability of causing injury or loss of life. Unreliable launchers are not necessarily unsafe, whereas reliable launchers are usually, but not invariably safe.

Apart from catastrophic failure of the launch vehicle itself other safety hazards include depressurisation, and the Van Allen radiation belts which preclude orbits which spend long periods within them.

Trajectory optimization

Carbon emissions
Many rockets use fossil fuels. A SpaceX Falcon Heavy rocket for instance burns through 400 metric tons of kerosene and emits more carbon dioxide in a few minutes than an average car would in more than two centuries. As the number of rocket launches is expected to increase heavily in the coming years, the effect that launching into orbit has on Earth is expected to get much worse. Some rocket manufacturers (i.e. Orbex, ArianeGroup) are using different launch fuels (such as bio-propane,methane produced from biomass).

Sustained spaceflight

Suborbital launch

Sub-orbital space flight is any space launch that reaches space without doing a full orbit around the planet, and requires a maximum speed of around 1 km/s just to reach space, and up to 7 km/s for longer distance such as an intercontinental space flight. An example of a sub-orbital flight would be a ballistic missile, or future tourist flight such as Virgin Galactic, or an intercontinental transport flight like SpaceLiner. Any space launch without an orbit-optimization correction to achieve a stable orbit will result in a suborbital space flight, unless there is sufficient thrust to leave orbit completely. (See Space gun#Getting to orbit)

Orbital launch

In addition, if orbit is required, then a much greater amount of energy must be generated in order to give the craft some sideways speed. The speed that must be achieved depends on the altitude of the orbit – less speed is needed at high altitude. However, after allowing for the extra potential energy of being at higher altitudes, overall more energy is used reaching higher orbits than lower ones.

The speed needed to maintain an orbit near the Earth's surface corresponds to a sideways speed of about 7.8 km/s (17,400 mph), an energy of about 30MJ/kg. This is several times the energy per kg of practical rocket propellant mixes.

Gaining the kinetic energy is awkward as the airdrag tends to slow the spacecraft, so rocket-powered spacecraft generally fly a compromise trajectory that leaves the thickest part of the atmosphere very early on, and then fly on for example, a Hohmann transfer orbit to reach the particular orbit that is required. This minimises the airdrag as well as minimising the time that the vehicle spends holding itself up. Airdrag is a significant issue with essentially all proposed and current launch systems, although usually less so than the difficulty of obtaining enough kinetic energy to simply reach orbit at all.

Escape velocity

If the Earth's gravity is to be overcome entirely then sufficient energy must be obtained by a spacecraft to exceed the depth of the gravity potential energy well. Once this has occurred, provided the energy is not lost in any non-conservative way, then the vehicle will leave the influence of the Earth. The depth of the potential well depends on the vehicle's position, and the energy depends on the vehicle's speed. If the kinetic energy exceeds the potential energy then escape occurs. At the Earth's surface this occurs at a speed of 11.2 km/s (25,000 mph), but in practice a much higher speed is needed due to airdrag.

Types of space launch

Rocket launch

Non-rocket launch

References

External links
 http://www.spacelaunchreport.com/ A periodic news digest of worldwide space launch activity.
 LATEST SATELLITE LAUNCHES from http://www.n2yo.com/
 The Space Review is an online publication devoted to in-depth articles, commentary, and reviews regarding all aspects of space exploration.

Spaceflight concepts